The men's 200 metres event at the 1971 Pan American Games was held in Cali on 2 and 3 August.

Medalists

Results

Heats
Held on 2 August

Wind:Heat 1: 0.0 m/s, Heat 2: 0.0 m/s, Heat 3: 0.0 m/s, Heat 4: 0.0 m/s

Semifinals
Held on 3 August

Wind:Heat 1: +3.1 m/s, Heat 2: +2.2 m/s

Final
Held on 3 August

Wind: +1.0 m/s

References

Athletics at the 1971 Pan American Games
1971